BFM Régions is a French network of local news television channels, property of Altice. It is partially modeled after the American News 12 Networks, which Altice also owns through its 2016 purchase of Cablevision.
The network is part of the BFM family of news and financial media properties.

Channel roster
BFM DICI Alpes du Sud
BFM DICI Haute-Provence
BFM Grand Lille
BFM Grand Littoral
BFM Paris Ile-de-France (formerly BFM Paris)
BFM Lyon
BFM Marseille Provence
BFM Nice Côte d'Azur
BFM Normandie
BFM Alsace
BFM Toulon Var

History

Origins
At the inception of French digital terrestrial television in the second half of the 2000s, BFM's then parent company NextRadioTV only expressed moderate interest in the local TV market. It did bid for a licence to broadcast in Paris, but was not selected.

However one of the winning channels, Cap 24, found itself on the market in 2010 after parent company Groupe Hersant Media decided to wind down its struggling Antennes Locales network. Cap 24 was first sold to Bernard Krief Consulting, a controversial LBO specialist, then quickly sold again to NextRadioTV.

NextRadioTV did not immediately put a full-fledged local channel in Cap 24's slot. Beginning in November 2010, it broadcast BFM Business Paris, a variant of its non-terrestrial national business news channel BFM Business. It was largely the same as the national version, with three hours of daily local programming thrown in to comply with France's local television mandates.

Expansion
In the summer of 2015, French multinational Altice became a major shareholder in NextRadioTV, with the latter's chairman Alain Weill touting the expanded strategic opportunities afforded by the alliance.

In the fall of 2016, BFM bid for the Toulouse local broadcast licence (left vacant by the previous operator's bankruptcy), but withdrew at the last minute and took a minority participation in the competing project, TV Sud Toulouse (later ViàOccitanie Toulouse), following some pushback from independent television trade groups.

In November 2016, BFM Business Paris was rebranded as BFM Paris, now a true capital region channel built around a majority of local programming.

In October 2018, BFM finally added another local station to its portfolio: TLM (Télé Lyon Métropole). Access to the country's second largest media market formally paved the way for a national network. TLM started broadcasting as BFM Lyon Métropole in September 2019 and just BFM Lyon in January 2020.

In February 2019, the network officially became known as "BFM Régions".

In November 2019, BFM acquired a significant minority share in two local channels owned by Lille area company Groupe SECOM: Grand Lille TV and Grand Littoral TV (the latter serving the Calais-Dunkirk market). In February 2020, both channels officially became BFM Grand Lille and BFM Grand Littoral. In the same transaction, BFM bought a stake in Grand Lille TV's sister radio station Grand Lille Info, which became Radio BFM Grand Lille.

In the summer of 2020, BFM acquired DICI (stylized D!CI), a small market but highly rated channel serving the southern part of the French Alps. In March 2021, it was replaced by two sister channels: BFM DICI Alpes-du-Sud (Hautes-Alpes) and BFM DICI Haute-Provence (Alpes-de-Haute-Provence).

In February 2021, Altice bought Azur TV, a regional network of three southeastern channels: Azur TV (Nice), Provence Azur TV (Menton-Marseille) and Toulon Azur TV, from Valeurs Actuelles publisher Iskandar Safa. In July 2021, their replacements BFM Nice Côte d'Azur, BFM Marseille Provence and BFM Toulon Var went on air.

In 2022, the local channels Alsace 20 and La Chaîne Normande will be rebranded BFM Alsace and BFM Normandie.

Aborted merger with the Vià network
In March 2020, Altice entered an agreement with Vià to merge that network's owned-and-operated stations with BFM Régions. Altice later backed out of the deal, arguing that its prospective partners had purposely underestimated the debt load of Vià's corporate entities. They went into receivership soon after. Altice bid for some of their assets but in April 2021, the Nîmes Commercial Court decided in favor of another buyer, La Dépêche du Midi, which was the employees' preferred choice.

References

External links
 Official BFM Régions website
 Official Altice France website

2019 establishments in France
Television stations in France
Television channels and stations established in 2019
French-language television stations